The 2019 Rugby Football League Championship was a rugby league football competition played primarily in England but including teams from Canada and France.  It is the second tier of the three tiers of professional rugby league in England, below Super League and above League 1. Following rule changes agreed at the end of the 2018 season, the Super 8's format has been abandoned and the Championship will feature a play-off system leading to promotion to Super League for one club while results during the regular season will lead to relegation to League 1 for two teams.

The 2019 Championship comprised 14 teams, which all played one another twice in the regular season, once at home and once away, totalling 26 games. The 2019 season also featured the "Summer Bash Weekend" for a fifth time so the regular season comprised 27 games for each team.

The Championship Grand Final was won by Toronto Wolfpack, who by beating Featherstone Rovers 24–6 also won promotion to Super League for the first time in the club's history, ahead of 2020 season. Toronto also won the RFL Championship Leaders' Shield, after finishing top of the league and completing a 100% home record, and only losing 1 game all season.

Betfred remain the sponsors of the Championship. The season started on 3 February 2019.

Teams
The Championship is made up of 14 teams, 11 of whom featured in the 2018 Championship; one, Widnes Vikings, who were relegated from Super League; and two, Bradford Bulls and York City Knights, who won promotion from League 1 in 2018.

Regular-season results

Final standings
Final standings at the end of regular season on 8 September 2019

Play-offs
At the end of the 27 game regular season, the top five teams enter a four-round play-off. The winners of the play-off final will earn promotion to Super League for 2020.

End-of-season awards
The end of season awards ceremony was held on 24 September 2019 when the following awards were made:
 Club Of The Year:  York City Knights
 Outstanding Achievement Award: Micky Higham, Oliver Wilkes
 Coach Of The Year: James Ford 
 Young Player Of The Year: Matty Ashton
 Player Of The Year: Gareth O'Brien

References

Rugby Football League Championship
2019 in English rugby league
2019 in French rugby league
2019 in Canadian sports